Nücü (also, Nedzhu and Nyudzhyu) is a village and municipality in the Lerik Rayon of Azerbaijan.  It has a population of 854.

References 

Populated places in Lerik District